DXWO (99.9 FM), broadcasting as 99.9 Radyo BisDak, is a radio station owned and operated by Times Broadcasting Network Corporation. The station's studio is located at Ariosa Bldg., Jamisola St., Pagadian City.

References

Radio stations in Zamboanga del Sur
Radio stations established in 1992
1992 establishments in the Philippines